Dayton Lakes is a city in Liberty County, Texas, United States. The population was 93 at the 2010 census. Prior to 1985 Dayton Lakes city was a developed and marketed recreational subdivision named Dayton Lake Estates. In January 1985 the corporation that marketed the original subdivision held and election of residents and when the election was successful, they petitioned the District Court in Liberty County, Texas and The City of Dayton Lakes, TX, a Non Profit Corporation, was created as a city/town. The actual document was filed and recorded on January 19, 1985. Those corporate papers are the city's legal identity.

Geography

Dayton Lakes is located in central Liberty County at  (30.145428, –94.821686), on the west bank of the Trinity River.

Demographics

As of the census of 2000, there were 101 people, 43 households, and 26 families residing in the city. The population density was 120.4 people per square mile (46.4/km2). There were 78 housing units at an average density of 93.0 per square mile (35.9/km2). The racial makeup of the city was 99.01% White and 0.99% African American.

There were 43 households, out of which 30.2% had children under the age of 18 living with them, 44.2% were married couples living together, 2.3% had a female householder with no husband present, and 39.5% were non-families. 34.9% of all households were made up of individuals, and 4.7% had someone living alone who was 65 years of age or older. The average household size was 2.35 and the average family size was 2.96.

In the city, the population was spread out, with 27.7% under the age of 18, 3.0% from 18 to 24, 34.7% from 25 to 44, 24.8% from 45 to 64, and 9.9% who were 65 years of age or older. The median age was 36 years. For every 100 females, there were 119.6 males. For every 100 females age 18 and over, there were 151.7 males.

The median income for a household in the city was $37,083, and the median income for a family was $30,938. Males had a median income of $40,750 versus $23,750 for females. The per capita income for the city was $12,873. There were 20.7% of families and 27.2% of the population living below the poverty line, including 30.8% of under eighteens and none of those over 64.

Education
The city of Dayton Lakes is served by the Dayton Independent School District.

References

Cities in Texas
Cities in Liberty County, Texas
Greater Houston